Sander Erik Kartum (born 3 October 1995) is a Norwegian football midfielder who plays for Kristiansund.

He started his youth career in Lånke IL, switching to IL Stjørdals-Blink in 2012. He made his senior debut in the summer of 2012, and took part in the team's rise from the 3. divisjon to the 1. divisjon. Ahead of the 2021 season he was bought by Kristiansund BK. He made his Eliteserien debut in May 2021 against Molde and scored his first goal later that month.

References

1995 births
Living people
People from Stjørdal
Norwegian footballers
IL Stjørdals-Blink players
Kristiansund BK players
Norwegian Third Division players
Norwegian Second Division players
Norwegian First Division players
Eliteserien players
Association football midfielders
Sportspeople from Trøndelag